A Pageant and Other Poems is Christina Rossetti's fourth collection of poetry. It was published in 1881 by Alexander Macmillan; the publisher agreed to publish it without having read the collection, based on the reception of Rossetti's previous poetry.

References

Poetry by Christina Rossetti
1881 books